Frank Seipelt (-Janscho) (15 April 1961 – 10 July 2009) was a West-German and German male weightlifter, who competed in the 110 kg category and represented West-Germany and later Germany at international competitions. He won the bronze medal in the clean & jerk at the 1991 World Weightlifting Championships lifting 215.0 kg. He represented West-Germany at the 1984 Summer Olympics and 1988 Summer Olympics and  Germany at the 1992 Summer Olympics in the 110 kg event.

References

External links
 

1961 births
2009 deaths
German male weightlifters
World Weightlifting Championships medalists
People from Furtwangen im Schwarzwald
Sportspeople from Freiburg (region)
Olympic weightlifters of Germany
Weightlifters at the 1992 Summer Olympics
Weightlifters at the 1984 Summer Olympics
Weightlifters at the 1988 Summer Olympics
West German male weightlifters
Olympic weightlifters of West Germany